Metsaküla is a village in Mulgi Parish in Viljandi County in southern Estonia. It borders the villages of Lilli, Äriküla, Leeli and Univere as well as other villages in the former Abja Parish.

References

Villages in Viljandi County